Frédéric Barbier (15 November 1829 – 12 February 1889) was a 19th-century French composer.

Biography
Frédéric Barbier was born in Metz, Lorraine, and was the son of Félix Henri Barbier and Adélaide Josephine Rosalie Rousseau. Barbier pursued a career in literary studies at Bourges College, while taking lessons in solfège, piano, harmony and counterpoint with Henry Darondeau, an organist in one of the churches of the city. His father, an engineer officer, wanted to see him join the École Polytechnique, of which he himself had been a pupil. But in 1848, the De Gasperi V Cabinet had created a new school, and the young Barbier preferred to compete for the latter and was admitted. This school was disbanded soon after and he began to study law. But music attracted him more and more.

In 1852, Frédéric Barbier had already written and presented in Bourges a small one-act opéra comique, Le Mariage de Colombine, but considered moving to Paris. Presented by influential figures to Edmond Seveste, then director of the Théâtre Lyrique, he met Adolphe Adam. Thanks to his advice and lessons of the latter, his first work Une Nuit à Séville,a one-act opéra comique, was played at the Théâtre Lyrique on 14 September 1855 and was warmly welcomed. Two months later, on 21 November, Frédéric Barbier gave the same theatre a new one act work entitled Rose et Narcissus, in which was also very successful.

Within 20 years, Barbier had over sixty more or less important works presented in every small opera house of Paris and in cafés-chantant, most of them in one act and approaching more and more the genre of comic operettas. He composed for the Eldorado, the Alcazar, the Ba-ta-clan, the Folies-Belleville, the Théâtre des Bouffes du Nord, etc., a great many number of operettas, saynètes, pantomimes and ballets.

Besides his opera production, Barbier wrote about 300 duets, romances, vocal mélodies, many dance music pieces, concert marches and orchestral fantasies on opera motifs, choirs for men voice, galops, valses, mazurkas, polkas, etc. In 1867, he was conductor at Théâtre International, and from 1873, he directed the orchestra at l'Alcazar d'Été, a position he shared with Henry Litolff. He collaborated as a critic to some small newspapers such as L'Avenir musical (1853), and L'Indépendance dramatique.

Main works

Operettas and opéras comiques

1852: Le Mariage de Colombine, one-act opéra comique, Théâtre de Bourges
1855: Une Nuit à Séville, one-act opéra comique, libretto by Charles Nuitter and Beaumont, Théâtre-Lyrique, 14 September 
1855: Rose et Narcisse, one-act opéra comique, libretto by Charles Nuitter and Beaumont, Théâtre-Lyrique, 21 November
1858: Le Pacha, one-act operetta, libretto by Charles Nuitter, Folies-Nouvelles, March
1858: Francastor, one-act operetta, libretto by Gustave Labottière and Achille Eyraud, Folies-Nouvelles, 22 May
1858: Le Page de Madame Malborough, one-act operetta, libretto by E. Vierne (Jules Verne), Folies-Nouvelles, 28 October
1858: Le Faux Faust, opérette parodie in 3 acts [composed under the pseudonym Stephan], Folies-Nouvelles, November 
1859: Le Docteur Tam-Tam, operetta bouffe in 1 act, libretto by Francis Tourte, Folies-Nouvelles, 5 March
1859: Monsieur Deschalumeaux, two-act operetta, libretto by Gustave Perée, Théâtre Déjazet, October
1861: Panne aux Airs, parody in 1 act, libretto by Clairville, Théâtre Déjazet, 30 March
1861: Flamberge au vent, one-act operetta, libretto by Charles Nuitter and Séjour (Victor Marcou)
1862: Versez, marquis !, one-act operetta, libretto by Alexis Bouvier and Edouard Prével, Folies-Marigny, 19 April
1862: La Cigale et la Fourmi, one-act operetta bouffe, libretto by Achille Eyraud (1821-1882), Folies-Marigny, 28 May
1862: Le Loup et l'Agneau, one-act operetta, libretto by Étienne Hippolyte Chol de Clercy and Hippolyte Messant, Théâtre Déjazet, October
1863: Madame Pygmalion, one-act operetta bouffe, libretto by Jules Adenis and Francis Tourte, Bouffes-Parisiens, 6 February
1863: les Trois Normandes, one-act operetta, libretto by Pol Mercier, Folies-Marigny, 21 March
1863: La Gamine du village, opérette en 1 acte, livret d'Alexis Bouvier (Folies-Marigny, 15 juillet 1863)
1863: Simon Terre-Neuve, one-act operetta, Théâtre Déjazet
1864: Deux permissions de dix heures, one-act operetta, libretto by Pol Mercier and Henry Currat, Théâtre Déjazet, May
1864: Achille chez Chiron, one-act operetta, libretto by Amédée de Jallais and Vulpian, Folies-Marigny, 14 October
1864: Le Miroir, one-act operetta, libretto by Charles Nuitter, October
1864: Un Souper chez Mademoiselle Contat, one-act operetta, libretto by Armand Liorat, Eldorado
1865: Un Congrès de modistes, opérette bouffe in 1 act, libretto by Marc Michel and Laurencin, Bouffes-Parisiens, 16 February
1865: La Nourrice d'Hercule, one-act operetta, Eldorado
1866: Les Oreilles de Midas, one-act opéra comique, libretto by Nérée Desarbres and Charles Nuitter, Fantaisies-Parisiennes, 21 April
1866: Don Juan de fantaisie, four-act operetta, Fantaisies-Parisiennes, 9 June
1866: Une Femme qui a perdu sa clef, one-act operetta, libretto by Léonce and Alexandre de Bar, Bouffes-Parisiens, 21 October
1867: Les Légendes de Gavarni, three-act opéra comique, libretto by Hippolyte Lefebvre, Bouffes-Parisiens, 29 January
1867: Gervaise, one-act opéra comique, libretto by Hippolyte Lefebvre and Alexis Bouvier, Théâtre-International, 17 June
1867: Le Nez de carton, one-act operetta, Eldorado
1867: L'Orchestre des Danoises, operetta, Alcazar
1868: Le Soldat malgré lui, two-act opéra comique, libretto by Henri Chivot and Alfred Duru, Théâtre des Fantaisies-Parisiennes, 19 October
1868: Le Souper d'Arlequin, one-act opérette bouffe, libretto by Jules Perrin, Eldorado, 28 November
1869: Balladine et Casquenfer, one-act opérette bouffe, libretto by Charles Blondelet and Félix Baumaine Eldorado, 15 February
1869: Faust et Marguerite, saynète bouffe in 1 act, libretto by Félix Baumaine and Charles Blondelet, Ambassadeurs, 23 July 
1869: Mam'zelle Pierrot, one-act operetta, libretto by Amédée de Jallais and Henry de Kock, Folies-Bergère, 26 September
1869: Don Férocio, saynète bouffe in 1 act, libretto by Charles Blondelet and Félix Baumaine, Eldorado, 23 October
1869: Fermé le dimanche, saynète in 1 act, libretto by Étienne Hippolyte Chol de Clercy, Eldorado, 13 December
1869: Le Beau Chasseur, one-act operetta, Eldorado
1869: Un Mariage au gros sel, one-act operetta, libretto by Armand Liorat, Eldorado, 10 July
1869: Millionnaire!, one-act operetta, Eldorado
1870: Un Procès en séparation, saynète in 1 act, lyrics by Hippolyte Bedeau, Eldorado, 12 January
1870: L'Acteur omnibus, fantaisie lyrique in 1 act, libretto by Jules Perrin and Jules Pacra, Eldorado, 12 March
1870: Lucrèce d'Orgeat, parody in 1 act, Eldorado
1870: On demande un pitre, one-act operetta, Eldorado
1871: Un Lendemain de noces, one-act operetta, Eldorado
1872: Les Points jaunes, saynète in 1 act, libretto by Jules Pacra and Fétré, Eldorado, 17 August
1872: La Bonne de ma tante, saynète bouffe in 1 act, libretto by Hippolyte Bedeau, Eldorado
1872: Une cause célèbre, one-act operetta, Eldorado
1873: Le Baromètre parisien, monologue by A. Philibert and Alphonse Siégel, Eldorado
1873: Le Coq est mort !, one-act operetta, Eldorado
1873: M'ame Nicolas, one-act operetta, libretto by Louis Gaston Villemer, Eldorado
1874: Mam'zelle Rose, one-act operetta, libretto by Adrien Decourcelle and Eugène Bercioux, after their comédie en vaudeville, Théâtre des Variétés
1874: Monsieur l'Alcade, one-act operetta, Eldorado
1875: Pierrot et la Belle enchantée, one-act operetta, Eldorado, 22 May
1875: Un Scandale à l'Alcazar, bouffonnerie musicale in 1 act, libretto by M. Duvert, Alcazar d'été, May
1875: Les Deux Choristes, one-act operetta, Eldorado, 11 September
1875: Le Champagne de ma tante, one-act operetta, libretto by Hippolyte Bedeau, Eldorado
1875: La Fermière et son garçon, one-act operetta, libretto by Auguste Jouhaud, Eldorado
1875: La Fête de Madame Denis, one-act operetta, libretto by Jules de Rieux and Louis Gaston Villemer, Alcazar d'été
1875: Marion de l'Orme, parody, Eldorado
1876: Les Cent mille francs du ténor, one-act operetta
1877: La Baronne de Haut-Castel, one-act operetta, libretto by Laurencin, Eldorado
1877: Le Carnaval des épiciers, three-act opéra comique, Bouffes-du-Nord, 6 April
1878: Les Deux Parfaits Notaires, one-act operetta, libretto by Louis Péricaud and Louis Gaston Villemer, Bouffes-Parisiens
1879: Le Verrou, one-act operetta, libretto by Louis Battaille, Eldorado, 31 October
1880: La Noce à Suzon, one-act operetta, libretto by Jouhaud and Louis Gaston Villemer, Alcazar d'été
1880: Atchi!, bouffonnerie musicale in 1 act, libretto by Hermil and Numès, Eldorado
1881: Le Supplice de Tantale, one-act operetta, libretto by E. Durafour
 La Chaumière indienne, one-act opéra comique
 Corinne, three-act opéra comique
 Les Incroyables, three-act opéra bouffe
 La Poupée automate, one-act operetta
 La Sainte Catherine, one-act operetta, Eldorado
 La Veuve Omphale, one-act operetta

Ballets
1859: Le Grand roi d'Yvetot, three-act vaudeville-pantomime, libretto by Louis-Émile Vanderburch and Albert Guinon, Théâtre Déjazet, December 
1875: Les Pifferari, ballet, Alcazar d'été, May
 La Balle enchantée, pantomime (Eldorado)
 Les Cascades de Pierrot, pantomime (Eldorado)
 Le Trésor de Cassandre, pantomime (Eldorado)

Mélodies
 La Révolte des noirs, lyrics by Francis Tourte
 Le Roi David, lyrics by Francis Tourte
 Toinon, lyrics by Francis Tourte
 Tout ça c'est à moi, lyrics by Francis Tourte

External links
 Frédéric Barbier, un compositeur d'opérettes on Vocalises.net
 Frédéric BARBIER on http://www.artlyriquefr
 Le petit monde on Gallica
 Frédéric Barbier on data.bnf.fr

1829 births
1889 deaths
19th-century classical composers
French ballet composers
French male classical composers
French operetta composers
Musicians from Metz
19th-century French male musicians